Chahar Maran may refer to:
 Chahar Maran, Chaharmahal and Bakhtiari
 Chahar Maran, North Khorasan

See also
 Chahar Muran (disambiguation)